The 2010–11 Grand Prix of Figure Skating Final was a figure skating competition in the 2010–11 season, held in conjunction with the ISU Junior Grand Prix Final. It was the culminating competition of both the 2010–11 ISU Grand Prix of Figure Skating, a senior-level international invitational competition, and the 2010–11 ISU Junior Grand Prix, a junior-level international competition.

The event was held in Beijing, China from December 8–12, 2010. Medals were awarded in the disciplines of men's singles, ladies' singles, pair skating, and ice dancing on the senior and junior levels.

Schedule
(Local Time, GMT +08:00)

 Thursday, December 9
 16:45 Junior ice dancing: Short dance
 18:10 Junior ladies: Short program
 19:35 Junior men: Short program
 21:00 Junior pairs: Short program
 Friday, December 10
 14:15 Junior ice dancing: Free dance
 15:45 Junior ladies: Free skating
 17:15 Ice dancing: Short dance
 18:25 Men: Short program
 19:30 Ladies: Short program
 20:35 Pairs: Short program
 Saturday, December 11
 13:45 Junior men: Free skating
 15:20 Junior pairs: Free skating
 16:55 Men: Free skating
 18:10 Ladies: Free skating
 19:20 Ice dancing: Free dance
 20:40 Pairs: Free skating
 Sunday, December 12
 Exhibition gala

Qualifiers

Senior-level qualifiers
 
Skaters who reached the age of 14 by July 1, 2010 were eligible to compete at two senior 2010–11 Grand Prix events, including the 2010 NHK Trophy, 2010 Skate Canada International, 2010 Cup of China, 2010 Skate America, 2010 Cup of Russia, and 2010 Trophée Éric Bompard. They earned points at these events and the six highest ranking skaters/teams qualified for the senior Grand Prix Final. The following skaters qualified for the 2010–11 Grand Prix Final.

Junior-level qualifiers
Skaters who reached the age of 13 by July 1, 2010 but were not yet 19 on that date (singles and females of the other two disciplines) or 21 (male pair skaters and ice dancers) were eligible to compete at two 2010–11 Junior Grand Prix events. They earned points at these events and the eight highest ranking skaters/teams qualified for the Junior Grand Prix Final.

The following skaters qualified for the 2010–11 Junior Grand Prix Final.

Competition notes
In the junior event, Kiri Baga had to withdraw due to Achilles tendinopathy in her left ankle. Sui Wenjing and Han Cong withdrew due to qualification to senior Grand Prix Final. There were allegations that two female skaters, Sui in the senior event and Yu Xiaoyu in the junior event, were too young for those competitions, while a male skater Jin Yang was alleged to be too old for the junior event.

Senior-level results

Men

Ladies

Pairs

Ice dancing

Medal count

Junior-level results

Junior men

Junior ladies

Junior pairs

Junior ice dancing

References

External links
 
 
 Senior entrants
 Starting orders/results

2010 in Chinese sport
2010 in figure skating
2010-11
2010-11
International figure skating competitions hosted by China
2010 in youth sport
2011 in youth sport